Arthur Friedenreich (18 July 1892 – 6 September 1969) was a Brazilian professional footballer who played as a forward. He was nicknamed The Tiger or The Original "Black" Pearl, and was arguably the sport's first outstanding mixed-race player. He played for the Brazil national team and was a record nine times top scorer of the State championship of São Paulo. He is occasionally identified as one of the all-time top scorers in football history, although this is highly disputed.

Biography

Personal life

Friedenreich was born in São Paulo to Oscar Friedenreich, a German businessman whose father immigrated to Brazil, and Mathilde, a Black Brazilian washerwoman and the daughter of freed slaves. Friedenreich was the first professional football player of Afro-Brazilian origin, because at that time football was dominated by Whites, and Blacks were not accepted. He faced many barriers because of racism, and he could not attend the same places where white players were, such as swimming pools, tennis courts and parties. Also Friedenreich found it hard to make connections and friends in the world of Brazilian football due to the color of his skin.

Friedenreich played football from his early childhood and then on. His father was very supportive of his skills and really helped him on his path to the great player he became.  At some point in his life he married his wife named Jonas and together they had a son who they named after Friedenreich's father, Oscar. Both outlived Friedenreich and were left with no money.

Style of play 
Friedenreich was often said to be the pioneer of 'jogo bonito' or 'the beautiful game', a style frequently associated with Brazilian football. The style involved playing very quickly with short passes as well as quick touches and combinations. It also relied on taking many long shots and attacking with 2-3 pacy strikers to disorient the defence. Despite being a shorter player (5 ft 7 in) he was known for his pace, power, and brilliant technical dribbling.

Early playing career

He started his career influenced by his father, playing for SC Germânia, a Brazilian football team composed of German immigrants. After playing with a succession of São Paulo club sides from 1910 onwards, Friedenreich made his debut with the national team in 1914 which was the first ever game Brazil played beating Exeter City 2–0. In the game, Friedenreich famously lost two of his front teeth due to a heavy slide tackle. He played twenty-two internationals, including wins in the 1919 and 1922 editions of the South American Championship, scoring ten goals. During the 1919 edition he became the first ever football player to score a hat-trick in a major international tournament. On Brazil's 1925 tour of Europe, he was feted as the King of Football. He was also the top scorer in the São Paulo League in 1912, 1914, 1917, 1918, 1919, 1921, 1927 and 1929.

Friedenreich was very young when he developed his own style of play and was 17 when he first became a part of an elite club. After that, Friedenreich bounced around from club to club until he found a long lasting home with CA Paulistano, a top Brazilian club. Friedenreich played for the club CA Paulistano for 12 years before the club disbanded. He then joined the club São Paulo da Floresta.

Later playing career
He wasn't picked by Brazil for the 1930 FIFA World Cup because there was a serious misunderstanding between the football Leagues of the States of Rio de Janeiro and São Paulo; only players from Rio travelled. São Paulo stars, like him (who was 38 years old), Filó (who was 1934 FIFA World Cup champion with Italy) and Feitiço, did not go to Uruguay. He continued to grow older and play for less and less elite clubs. After 1934 he only played locally and competed in those clubs. The last team he played for before his retirement very late in his career in the year 1935, was the Flamengo team from Rio de Janeiro

After football
In the 1930s, Brazilian football was beginning the process of professionalization, and in 1933 it became reality. Friedenreich was against the professionalization of football in the country. Outraged, he refused to continue playing football, and retired playing for Flamengo at 43 years old. His last match was against Fluminense on 21 July 1935 (the game ended in a 2–2 draw; he didn't score that day). He then started working in a liquor company and retired while there. When he retired Arthur got Alzheimer's disease and the treatment took most of his money while trying to treat this disorder. Arthur would end up losing most if not all of his money to this disease. He lived in a house ceded by São Paulo football club until he died on 6 September 1969 at 77 years old.

Posthumous tributes
There is a park in the Vila Alpina neighborhood, on the east side of São Paulo, with his name. The park, located at the beginning of Francisco Falconi avenue, is one of the biggest of the region. Still on the east side of São Paulo, there is a street with his name. In Rio de Janeiro, there is a school with his name, located within the sports complex of Maracanã, near the main entrance, on the left of Bellini statue.

Discrimination and race in Brazilian football 
Friedenreich was born of Afro-Brazilian origin making him a person of mixed race. Brazil was one of the last countries to outlaw slavery in 1888. This was only four years before Friedenreich was born. Due to this Friedenreich felt the pressure of discrimination throughout his life and career. For instance, being denied playing in the 1921 South American championship in Argentina. While Friedenreich never took on the role of a spokesman against discrimination, he did break many barriers by playing football in general. He also did not embrace his culture to an extreme, even using tactics to appear more white. He did this by dressing, acting, and behaving like many other white players. Many black players in Brazil would put flour or rice powder on their faces to appear whiter. In many instances Friedenreich would spend much time straightening his hair before games to look "white".

Controversy in the number of goals
The exact number of goals that Friedenreich scored is unknown, due to lack of documentation. There is not a proper number that could be the number of goals he scored, only a few supposed numbers that have come up over the years. The most famous supposed number of goals is 1,329, that Friedenreich would have scored in 1,239 matches. Friedenreich's father and his former teammate Mario de Andrade had both compiled his goalscoring record, but it mysteriously vanished in the mid-1960s, during a time when Friedenreich himself had Alzheimer's disease.

Some supposed numbers
 Between 1909 and 1935
 554 goals in 561 matches - Alexandre da Costa, in the book O Tigre do futebol
 558 goals in 562 matches - Orlando Duarte e Severino Filho, in the book Fried versus Pelé
 354 goals in 323 matches - IFFHS
 105 goals in 125 matches - Memorial of São Paulo FC

Playing record

Clubs
 1909: Germânia
 1910: Ypiranga
 1911: Germânia
 1912: Mackenzie College
 1913: Ypiranga
 1913: Americano from Santos
 1913–14: Paulista ?
 1914: Atlas* (Atlas Flamengo FC from Santos) ?
 1914–15: Ypiranga
 1915–16: Payssandu
 1916: Paulistano
 1917: Ypiranga
 1917: Flamengo
 1917–29: Paulistano
 1929: Internacional*
 1929: Atlético Santista*
 1930: Santos*
 1930–35: São Paulo
 1933: Dois de Julho (BA)*
 1933: Atlético*
 1935: Santos
 1935: Flamengo
 *) just for one match.
 clubs with "?" are not definitively identified.

Top scorer
He was top scorer of the Liga Paulista in the following years:

Because of the internal quarrels and the ensuing split of the league into the LPF and APEA he had to share the top scorer title with the following players in the following years:

Honours
Paulistano
Campeonato Paulista: 1918, 1919, 1921, 1926, 1927, 1929

São Paulo
Campeonato Paulista: 1931

Brazil
South American Championship: 1919, 1922
Roca Cup: 1914

Individual
South American Championship player of the tournament: 1919
South American Championship top scorer: 1919
IFFHS Brazilian Player of the 20th Century (5th place)
IFFHS South American Player of the 20th Century (13th place)
Campeonato Paulista top scorer: 1912, 1914, 1917, 1918, 1919, 1921, 1927, 1928, 1929

See also
German Brazilians

References

External links
 List of appearances and goals at RSSSF

1892 births
1969 deaths
Footballers from São Paulo
Brazilian footballers
Association football forwards
Brazil international footballers
Brazilian football referees
Copa América-winning players
São Paulo FC players
CR Flamengo footballers
Brazilian people of German descent